César Augusto da Silva Lemos, usually called César Maluco or just César, (born 17 May 1945, Niterói) is a former Brazilian footballer who was included in the 1974 FIFA World Cup squad of the Brazil national football team. He played for Palmeiras.

Career
Born in Niteroi, César began playing youth football with local sides Canto do Rio and Flamengo. Palmeiras manager, Aymoré Moreira took César to the club on loan in 1967. That year, he played for Palmeiras in the Torneio Roberto Gomes Pedrosa, scoring 15 goals as the club won the title.

Personal
César Maluco's brothers, Caio Cambalhota and Luisinho Lemos, were also professional footballers.

References

1945 births
Living people
Sportspeople from Niterói
Brazilian footballers
Brazilian expatriate footballers
Brazil international footballers
1974 FIFA World Cup players
CR Flamengo footballers
Sociedade Esportiva Palmeiras players
Sport Club Corinthians Paulista players
Santos FC players
Fluminense FC players
Botafogo Futebol Clube (SP) players
Universidad de Chile footballers
Chilean Primera División players
Expatriate footballers in Chile
Brazilian expatriate sportspeople in Chile
Association football forwards